Françoise Monod (born 20 April 1959) is a Swiss former freestyle swimmer. She competed in five events at the 1972 Summer Olympics.

References

External links
 

1959 births
Living people
Swiss female freestyle swimmers
Olympic swimmers of Switzerland
Swimmers at the 1972 Summer Olympics
Place of birth missing (living people)
20th-century Swiss women